Dmitri Stulov (born 5 September 1973) is a Russian former professional ice hockey defenceman. He is currently the head coach of Sarmaty Orenburzhya of the Russian under-20 Junior Hockey League.

Personal
His son Dmitri Stulov Jr. (born 1994) is a defenceman who plays with HC Lada Togliatti of the Kontinental Hockey League (KHL).

References

1973 births
Living people
HC Lada Togliatti players
HC Neftekhimik Nizhnekamsk players
HC Sibir Novosibirsk players
HC Spartak Moscow players
Krylya Sovetov Moscow players
Lokomotiv Yaroslavl players
Russian ice hockey coaches
Russian ice hockey defencemen
Severstal Cherepovets players